The 1980 United States Senate election in Utah took place on November 4, 1980.

Incumbent Republican U.S Senator Jake Garn won re-election to a second term in a landslide against Democrat Dan Berman.

American Party primary

Candidates
 George M. Batchelor
 Lawrence Rey Topham

Results

After losing the primary, Topham became the American Party nominee for Governor of Utah.

Democratic primary

Candidates
 Dan Berman, attorney
 A. Stephen Dirks, Mayor of Ogden

Results

General election

Results

See also 
 1980 United States Senate elections

References 

1980
Utah
United States Senate